Technical Communication Quarterly is a quarterly peer-reviewed academic journal that covers technical communication in a variety of fields (business, science, and technology, among others). It combines both theoretical and practical perspectives in its research articles. The journal was established in 1992 and is published by Taylor & Francis on behalf of the Association of Teachers of Technical Writing (ATTW). The editor-in-chief is Rebecca Walton (Utah State  University). Previous editors have been Donald Cunningham (founding editor), Victoria Mikelonis, Mary Lay, Billie Wahlstrom, Charlotte Thralls, Mark Zachry, Amy Koerber, and Donna Kain.

Abstracting and Indexing 
The journal is abstracted and indexed in ABI/Inform, Academic Search Premier, MLA International Bibliography, PsycINFO/Psychological Abstracts, and Scopus.

References

External links 
 
 Journal page at Association of Teachers of Technical Writing

Taylor & Francis academic journals
Quarterly journals
English-language journals
Publications established in 1992
Communication journals